is a 2015 Japanese drama film edited, written, and directed by Ryōsuke Hashiguchi. It was released on November 14, 2015.

Plot

Cast
Atsushi Shinohara
Tōko Narushima

Lily Franky

Ken Mitsuishi

Reception
Deborah Young of The Hollywood Reporter said that the movie's "sensitive filmmaking communicates the quiet desperation of real-life love."

At the 37th Yokohama Film Festival, the film was chosen as the second best Japanese film of 2015. Ryōsuke Hashiguchi won the award for Best Director and Ken Mitsuishi won the award for Best Supporting Actor.

References

External links

2010s Japanese films
2015 drama films
2015 films
Films directed by Ryōsuke Hashiguchi
Japanese drama films